2nd Bundesliga may refer to:
 2. Bundesliga, the second division in German football (association football)
 2. Basketball Bundesliga, the second division in German men's basketball
 2. Handball-Bundesliga, the second division in German men's handball
 2nd Bundesliga (ice hockey), formerly the second division in German Ice Hockey
 2nd Rugby-Bundesliga, the second division in German Rugby union competitions for men and women
 Zweite Judo-Bundesliga the second division in Austrian men's judo

See also
 Bundesliga (disambiguation), the name for the premier league of any sport in Germany or Austria
 German Football League 2, the second division of American football in Germany
 Regionalliga, a designation in Germany for sports leagues, which are led by one or more regional federations